The Nyole, also known as Nyore, are a tribe of the Luhya nation from Bunyore in Western Kenya. Native speakers of the Nyole (or Nyore) dialect of Luhya refer to themselves as Abanyole.

In Swahili, they are known as Wanyore

Some prominent Nyore leaders include:
Kenneth Marende the Former Speaker of the National Assembly of Kenya's 10th Parliament. He was elected as Speaker on January 15, 2008.
Wilberforce Otichilo Current governor vihiga County

See also 
 Luhya people whose native modern homeland is in Emuhaya ,Luanda vihiga as well on borders where subcounties of vihiga  county,and in  Kisumu siyia and nandi near vihiga border]
 Luhya languages

Luhya